Louisburg High School (LHS) is a fully accredited public high school located in Louisburg, Kansas, United States.  It is operated by Louisburg USD 416 school district, serving students in grades 9–12.  The school colors are purple and white and the school mascot is the Wildcat.

Extracurricular activities

Athletics
The Wildcats are classified as a 4A school, the third-largest classification in Kansas according to the Kansas State High School Activities Association. LHS competes In the Frontier League. In 2010, the Louisburg High School football team was undefeated and won the state championship. In 2021, their track and field team won the 4A State championship.

Marching Wildcat Band
The Louisburg High School Marching Wildcat Band has participated in many events, including the 2018 Rose Parade on New Year's Day in Pasadena, California.

Notable alumni
 2012 graduate Garrett Griffin, former Air Force tight end, played professionally for two National Football League teams

See also
 List of high schools in Kansas
 List of unified school districts in Kansas

References

External links
 School website
 School district
 USD 416 School District Boundary Map, KDOT

Public high schools in Kansas
Schools in Miami County, Kansas